Patrick Cullity (born January 26, 1987) is an American former professional ice hockey defenseman. He most notably played with the Bridgeport Sound Tigers of the American Hockey League (AHL).

Playing career
Prior to turning professional, Cullity attended and graduated from the University of Vermont where he played four seasons of NCAA Division I college ice hockey with the Vermont Catamounts men's ice hockey team.

On September 23, 2011, Cullity signed with the ECHL's Utah Grizzlies. He finished the season with the Springfield Falcons of the AHL and in 2012–13 he skated for the Idaho Steelheads and again with Springfield before moving to St. John's in March 2013.

On August 19, 2015, left the Steelheads as a free agent, signing a one-year ECHL contract with the Missouri Mavericks.

After completing his third season within the Bridgeport Sound Tigers in 2017–18, Cullity ended his 8 year professional career, opting to pursue a career in medical sales.

Career statistics

References

External links

1987 births
Living people
Abbotsford Heat players
American men's ice hockey defensemen
Bridgeport Sound Tigers players
Ice hockey players from Massachusetts
Idaho Steelheads (ECHL) players
Missouri Mavericks players
St. John's IceCaps players
South Carolina Stingrays players
Springfield Falcons players
Syracuse Crunch players
Utah Grizzlies (ECHL) players
Vermont Catamounts men's ice hockey players
Worcester Railers players